Hayward High School (HHS) serves students in and around Hayward, Wisconsin.

History
Hayward High School was originally established between 4th and 5th Streets and Minnesota and Wisconsin Avenues in downtown Hayward. The building was demolished in March 2017 in order to provide expanded parking for the current Intermediate School.

Academics
Hayward Community Schools received the "What Parents Want" award in 2012.  Hayward High School received a Silver Award from U.S. News & World Report for the 2010-2011 school year.

Clubs and organizations
Student involvement is encouraged by the establishment of several clubs and organizations. Forensics, Skills USA, band, marching band, jazz band, Yearbook Club, Drama Club, Cross-Age Peer Educators, Class Board, a poetry club, Character education, and many other organizations are run by students, staff, or combinations of students and staff.

Sports
 Fall: cross country, football, boys' soccer, girls' volleyball, girls' golf, cheerleading
 Winter: girls' and boys' basketball, girls' and boys' hockey, cross country skiing, boys' wrestling, cheerleading
 Spring: baseball, softball, track and field, boys' golf

References

Educational institutions in the United States with year of establishment missing
Public high schools in Wisconsin
Schools in Sawyer County, Wisconsin